Hamilton Fish (1808–1893) was the 26th United States Secretary of State

Hamilton Fish may also refer to:
Hamilton Fish II (1849–1936), congressman and son of Hamilton Fish
Hamilton Howard "Albert" Fish (1870–1936), American cannibalistic serial killer, rapist, and kidnapper 
Hamilton Fish II (Rough Rider) (1874–1898), grandson of Hamilton Fish
Hamilton Fish III (1888–1991), congressman and son of Hamilton Fish II
Hamilton Fish IV (1926–1996), congressman and son of Hamilton Fish III
Hamilton Fish V (born 1952), congressional candidate, publisher, philanthropist, and son of Hamilton Fish IV

See also
Hamilton Fish Kean (1862–1941), American politician, grandnephew of Hamilton Fish
Hamilton Fish Armstrong (1893–1973), grandnephew by marriage of Hamilton Fish, U.S. diplomat and editor of Foreign Affairs.